Mihal Spasov Ashminov (born March 27, 1982) is a Bulgarian celebrity chef working in South Korea. He is master chef of Bulgarian restaurant Zelen in Yongin, and was one of the chefs participating in the variety show Please Take Care of My Refrigerator.

Personal
Born to a Bulgarian father and a Polish mother in Sofia, the capital of Bulgaria, Ashminov worked at the Sheraton Hotel Balkan in Sofia before being transferred to a hotel in Seoul, where he opened his own restaurant and eventually got cast in Please Take Care of My Refrigerator.

Filmography

Television

References

External links
Zelen official facebook

1982 births
Living people
Bulgarian chefs
Bulgarian television personalities
Bulgarian expatriates in South Korea
Bulgarian people of Polish descent